Friedrich Wilhelm von Prittwitz und Gaffron (1 September 1884 – 1 September 1955) was a German Ambassador to the United States under the Weimar Republic, from 1928 until 14 April 1933.  He was in office at the time that Adolf Hitler came to power in Germany, and resigned from the diplomatic corps in protest the day after Hitler was appointed Chancellor. He had hosted German Jewish playwright Lion Feuchtwanger at a dinner that day.  On the day of his resignation, Prittwitz called Feuchtwanger and recommended that he not return to Germany. In 1945 he was a founding member of the Christian Social Union in Bavaria, and he served as a member of the Parliament of Bavaria from 1946 to 1954.

Honours
Honorary doctorate, Columbia University

References

 René Moehrle, Judenverfolgung in Triest während Faschismus und Nationalsozialismus 1922–1945, Berlin 2014, S. 165–174.

External links
 
 
 

1884 births
1955 deaths
Silesian nobility
Ambassadors of Germany to the United States
Knights Commander of the Order of Merit of the Federal Republic of Germany